Bennett High School was an American high school located in the University Heights section of Buffalo, New York. It was named after Lewis J. Bennett, who donated the land for the school and for All High Stadium. Bennett High School formerly was a magnet school with three college prep programs: the Academy of International Law (similar to pre-law), Business and Computers (similar to information systems), and Education and the Arts.

History 
Bennett High School was built in 1923. It is named after Lewis J. Bennett, who donated the land for the school and for All High Stadium. Portions of the 1984 movie The Natural were filmed in All High Stadium, although it was filmed as Wrigley Field.

The school was renovated in the summer of 2005 and the summer of 2006. During this time, some students were housed at Bennett while others were housed at nearby School 63 on Minnesota Avenue.

In 2014, the alumni association and the Buffalo Board of Education worked cooperatively to bring a dramatic change to the curriculum at Bennett.  In 2017, the last class of students in the original Bennett programs graduated.  At the same time a new program was put into place, the Lewis J. Bennett High School of Innovative Technology.  Its first graduating class will be in 2020.

Notable alumni
 Michael Bennett (1943 – 1987), who wrote the Broadway musical A Chorus Line dropped his last name, DiFiglia, when he went to Broadway.
 Lawrence Block (b. 1938), writer
 Sorrell Booke (1930 – 1994), who played Boss Hogg in the Dukes of Hazard TV show was a 1948 Bennett grad.
 John Elliot (1914 – 1972), songwriter
 Leslie Feinberg (1949 – 2014), author and activist
 Don Gilbert (b.  1943), CFL player
 Sanford Greenberg (b. 1940), American investor, philanthropist 
 Reed Hadley (1911 – 1974), actor
 Karla F.C. Holloway (b. 1949), James B. Duke Professor of English, Professor of Law, Duke University. Dean, Humanities & Social Sciences. Was Karla Clapp at Bennett, led debate team to statewide championship.
 Catherine Ryan Hyde ( b.1955), novelist, author of Pay It Forward
 Rick James (1948 – 2004), funk superstar, played in the Bennett High School Band.
 Beverly Johnson (b. 1952), fashion model, was a graduate of Bennett High School. She was the first Black cover model for Vogue.
 Dr. John H. Kennell (1922 – 2013), doctor of pediatrics and researcher
 Bob Lanier (b. 1948), Basketball Hall of Famer, graduated from Bennett in 1966
 David Lucas (b. 1937), music producer and jingle writer, attended Bennett in the 1950s but then transferred to a school in Florida.
 Isaiah McDuffie, NFL player
 Dick Offenhamer (1913 – 1998), former University at Buffalo football coach
 Robert E. Rich, Sr. (1913 – 2006), founder of Rich Products Corporation, was the starting center for the Bennett High School football team which lost the 1930 Harvard Cup to South Park 13–2.
 Antoine Thompson (b. 1970), former New York State Senator
 Westside Gunn (b. 1982), Rapper, Fashion Designer, Art Connoisseur

References

External links 
 Buffalo Public Schools homepage

1920 establishments in New York (state)
2017 disestablishments in New York (state)
Defunct schools in New York (state)
High schools in Buffalo, New York
Magnet schools in New York (state)
Magnet schools in Buffalo, New York
Educational institutions established in 1920
Educational institutions disestablished in 2017